The S.I. Newhouse School of Public Communications, commonly known as Newhouse School, is the communications and journalism school of Syracuse University in Syracuse, NY. It has programs in print and broadcast journalism; music business; graphic design; advertising; public relations; and television, radio and film. The school was named after publishing magnate Samuel Irving Newhouse Sr., founder of Advance Publications, who provided the founding gift in 1964.

Mark J. Lodato has been the dean of the Newhouse School since July 2020. The school includes about 80 full-time faculty members and about 50 adjunct instructors. Enrollment includes approximately 2,000 undergraduate students, 180 residential master’s degree students, 200 online master's degree students, and 15 doctoral degree candidates as of 2022. Undergraduate admissions are highly selective.

History

Early years 
The Department of Journalism was established at Syracuse University in 1919 as a part of the College of Business Administration. The Theta Sigma Phi journalism sorority was established in 1920. SU produced a radio show over WSYR-FM in 1932 and the production studio was housed in the Crouse College.

Formation of the School of Journalism
The department became a separate School of Journalism in 1934, with Matthew Lyle Spencer serving as the founding dean. The new school was housed in the Yates Castle (Renwick Castle) from 1934 until the buildings demolition in 1954. The school was moved into the Old Gym from 1953 until that building was razed in 1965.

In 1932, Syracuse University became the first university in the nation to offer a college credit radio course. In 1947, SU launched WAER, one of the nation's first college radio stations. With the emergence of television, SU was the first to offer instruction in the field in 1956.

Construction of the Newhouse Complex

In 1964, supported by a $15 million gift from Samuel Irving "S. I." Newhouse Jr., the Newhouse Communications Complex was officially inaugurated in Newhouse 1, an award-winning building designed by architect I. M. Pei, which housed the School of Journalism. The building was dedicated by President Lyndon B. Johnson, who delivered his famous "Gulf of Tonkin Speech" on the Newhouse Plaza.

In 1971, the School of Journalism merged with the Department of Television-Radio and was renamed the S. I. Newhouse School of Public Communications. A second building, Newhouse 2, was dedicated in 1974 with a keynote address by William S. Paley, chairman of the board of CBS. It cost $7.2 million to build.

In 2003, the Newhouse School received a $15 million gift from the S. I. Newhouse Foundation and the Newhouse family to fund the construction of the third building in the Newhouse Communications Complex. The $31.6 million  modern structure, designed by the former Polshek Partnership, features the First Amendment etched in six-foot-high letters on its curving glass windows. Newhouse 3 was dedicated on September 19, 2007, with a keynote address from Chief Justice of the United States John Roberts

In September 2014, the school completed an $18 million renovation of the Newhouse 2 building, creating the Newhouse Studio and Innovation Center, which features Dick Clark Studios, the Alan Gerry Center for Media Innovation and the Diane and Bob Miron Digital News Center. Oprah Winfrey attended and spoke at the dedication ceremony.

In January 2020, Donald E. Newhouse donated $75 million to the School through the Newhouse Foundation.

Student activities 
Most Newhouse students participate in extracurricular activities to gain experience in their chosen field of study. On-campus publications include The Daily Orange, an independent student-run newspaper; The Newshouse, an online news site; and numerous magazines. The university has three radio stations on campus: WJPZ, a Top 40 station that broadcasts to the Syracuse market; WERW, a free-format station; and WAER, one of the two NPR stations in Syracuse, which has an entirely student-run sports department. On-campus television stations include Orange Television Network and CitrusTV, the largest entirely student-run campus TV station in the country. Newhouse student-run agencies include Hill Communications (public relations) and TNH (advertising).

There are also a number of diversity-based organizations for students, including the National Association of Black Journalists and the National Association of Hispanic Journalists.

The student chapter of NLGJA: The Association of LGBTQ Journalists, was launched in May 2022.

Study abroad 

The Newhouse School offers multiple study abroad opportunities in addition to the SU Abroad program offered by the university. Newhouse students have the ability to work in Dubai, India, and France annually, and the London SU Abroad center offers classes directed by Newhouse.

Olympics 

NBC, which owns the rights to Olympic television coverage in the United States, visits campus to recruit Newhouse students for internships every two years. The corporation normally conducts on-campus interviews one year before the games. Twenty-three students covered the 2016 Summer Olympics in Rio de Janeiro as paid interns for NBC.

Degrees 

In July 2015, the Newhouse School began offering an Online Master's in Communications.

Centers and Special Projects

Deans of the Newhouse School of Public Communications 

 1934–1950 Lyle Spencer
 1950–1972 Wesley Clark
 1972–1980 Henry Schulte
 1980–1989 Edward Stephens
 1989–1990 Lawrence Myers Jr.
 1990–2008 David Rubin
 2008–2019 Lorraine Branham
 2019–2020 Amy Falkner (interim)
 2020– Mark J. Lodato

Notable Newhouse alumni

See also
Mirror Awards
Toner Prize for Excellence in Political Reporting

References

External links

 
 The Newshouse, Student-run Newspaper

1919 establishments in New York (state)
Educational institutions established in 1919
Newhouse
Journalism schools in the United States

Newhouse family
I. M. Pei buildings